Barry Allan (born 26 September 1942) is a former Australian rules footballer who played with North Melbourne in the Victorian Football League (VFL).

Allan, who was recruited from Beaconsfield in the South West Gippsland Football League, is the son of 1940s North Melbourne player Ron Allan.

A ruckman, Allan played 61 league games for North Melbourne, from 1962 to 1967.

He had been appointed captain-coach of Pakenham in 1966, but North Melbourne refused to clear him.

References

1942 births
Australian rules footballers from Victoria (Australia)
North Melbourne Football Club players
Living people